Maldon is a constituency in Essex represented in the House of Commons of the UK Parliament since 2010 by Sir John Whittingdale, a Conservative.

Constituency profile
Maldon covers a rural area of Essex including the Dengie Peninsula. The main settlements are Maldon and Burnham-on-Crouch on the coast, and the new town of South Woodham Ferrers. The seat is slightly wealthier than the UK average.

History
The Parliamentary Borough of Maldon, which included the parish of Heybridge, had sent two members to Parliament since 1332 (36 years after the Model Parliament). Under the Reform Act of 1867, its representation was reduced to one and in 1885 the Parliamentary Borough was abolished and replaced with a Division of the County of Essex (later a County Constituency) under the Redistribution of Seats Act 1885.

The constituency was abolished for the 1983 general election following the Third Periodic Review of Westminster Constituencies, but re-established for the 2010 general election by the Fifth Review. The current seat is a successor to the Maldon and East Chelmsford constituency which existed from 1997 to 2010.

Boundaries

1885–1918: The Municipal Borough of Maldon, the Sessional Divisions of Hinckford South (Braintree Bench) and Witham, and parts of the Sessional Divisions of Hinckford South (Halstead Bench), Lexden, and Winstree.

Formally known as the Eastern or Maldon Division of Essex, incorporating the abolished Parliamentary Borough of Maldon and extending northwards to include the towns of Witham, Braintree and Halstead.

1918–1950: The Municipal Borough of Maldon, the Urban Districts of Braintree, Burnham-on-Crouch, and Witham, the Rural District of Maldon, and the Rural District of Braintree (including the detached part of the parish of Inworth which was wholly surrounded by the parishes of Great Braxted and Kelvedon).

Area to the south between River Crouch and River Blackwater, including Burnham-on-Crouch, transferred from the South-Eastern Division of Essex.  The northernmost area, including Halstead, and eastern fringes transferred to Saffron Walden and Colchester respectively.  Other minor changes.

1950–1955: The Municipal Borough of Maldon, the Urban Districts of Braintree and Bocking, Burnham-on-Crouch, and Witham, the Rural District of Maldon, and part of the Rural District of Braintree.

Marginal changes as a result of changes to local authority boundaries.

1955–1974: The Municipal Borough of Maldon, the Urban Districts of Braintree and Bocking, Burnham-on-Crouch, and Witham, the Rural District of Maldon, and part of the Rural District of Braintree as altered by the County of Essex (Braintree and Lexden and Winstree Rural Districts) Confirmation Order 1955.

Marginal changes as a result of changes to local authority boundaries.

1974–1983: The Municipal Borough of Maldon, the Urban District of Burnham-on-Crouch, and the Rural Districts of Maldon and Rochford.

The Urban Districts of Braintree and Bocking, and Witham and the Rural District of Braintree formed the basis for the new County Constituency of Braintree.  The Rural District of Rochford transferred from South East Essex.

Constituency abolished for the 1983 general election.  Southern area, comprising the former Rural District of Rochford, included in the new County Constituency of Rochford.  Remainder formed the majority of the new County Constituency of South Colchester and Maldon.

2010–present: The District of Maldon wards of Althorne, Burnham-on-Crouch North, Burnham-on-Crouch South, Heybridge East, Heybridge West, Maldon East, Maldon North, Maldon South, Maldon West, Mayland, Purleigh, Southminster, and Tillingham, and the Borough of Chelmsford wards of Bicknacre and East and West Hanningfield, Little Baddow, Danbury and Sandon, Rettendon and Runwell, South Hanningfield, Stock and Margaretting, South Woodham Chetwood and Collingwood, and South Woodham Elmwood and Woodville.

Following the Boundary Commission's Fifth Periodic Review of Westminster constituencies, Parliament radically altered some constituencies and created new ones to allow for changes in population. The majority of the former Maldon and East Chelmsford constituency formed the basis of this new seat for 2010. The constituency included Maldon and Burnham-on-Crouch, and lost the Chelmsford parts . To compensate, wards in and around South Woodham Ferrers were added from the former Rayleigh constituency, and Margaretting was added from the former West Chelmsford constituency.

The historic constituency (1332–1983)

Maldon was originally a Parliamentary borough in Essex, first represented in the House of Commons in 1332; it elected two MPs until 1868, and one from 1868 until 1885. In that year the borough was abolished but the name was transferred to a county division of Essex, which continued with some boundary changes until 1983.

Maldon borough (1332–1885)

Boundaries and franchise before the Reform Act
Until the Great Reform Act of 1832, the borough consisted of the three parishes of the town of Maldon, a small market town and port on the coast of Essex.

Maldon had been a municipal as well as a Parliamentary borough. Its first charter dated from the reign of Henry II, and at one time the corporation had the sole right to elect the town's MPs. From 1701 at the latest, however, the right to vote was exercised by the freemen of the town, whether or not resident within the borough; and, unusually, honorary freemen and those acquiring the freedom by purchase were also entitled to vote in Maldon. This had several consequences. The electorate in Maldon was much bigger than was usual in a town of that size — in the first half of the 18th century, the number of qualified voters was generally about 800 (the majority of whom did not live in Maldon). It also meant that the town corporation, with the power to create freemen and therefore voters, was in a position to gerrymander elections if it so wished. This might, as was the case in some other boroughs, have ended in one interest gaining control of the corporation and turning Maldon into a pocket borough; in fact, however, Maldon instead stayed independent but venal, and gaining election there tended to be an expensive business. Sometimes it was not merely a case of bribing the voters: in 1690, it was recorded in the House of Commons journals that the wives and daughters of Maldon freemen were being bribed at election time as well.

One interest that was firmly established by the middle of the 18th century, however, was that of the government, which ensured that lucrative posts in the customs house were reserved for loyally-voting freemen, and also attempted to have government supporters – often strangers to the town – elected to vacancies on the corporation. It was generally taken for granted that the government candidates would normally be elected.

The Strutt ascendancy
However, in the 1750s the government's control of Maldon weakened, and a prominent local Tory, John Strutt, found he had enough influence with the voters to sway elections. He secured the election of several of his friends over the years and eventually, in 1774, successfully stood for election himself.

In the meanwhile, however, there was a dramatic change in the system. In 1763 one of the sitting MPs, Strutt's friend Bamber Gascoyne, was appointed to the Board of Trade and therefore had to stand for re-election at Maldon. Gascoyne's opponent, John Huske, accused him of threatening that any freemen working in the customs house who did not vote for him would be dismissed (which, by that time, would have been an illegal threat). Although the Prime Minister, George Grenville, denied having authorised Gascoyne to make any such threat and Gascoyne denied having made it, it seems clear it was believed in Maldon and the corporation sided with Huske, creating enough new freemen to ensure Gascoyne was defeated. Both sides started actions for bribery, but Gascoyne had decided on more drastic action. He took out a writ against the corporation, and the Courts ordered the ousting of the majority of members; eventually, in 1768, the corporation was dissolved by judicial order.

For half a century the duties of returning officer were transferred to the High Sheriff of Essex. However, the Sheriff could not assume the corporation's function of swearing in new freemen, and Strutt's influence was thus entirely secured against any possibility of new voters being created to outvote him. However, there was a problem: by the time of the general election of 1807 the number of remaining qualified voters had dwindled to 58, and the constituency was in imminent danger of quite literally dying out. Yet there were more than 800 new freemen who were only barred from voting because there was nobody to swear them in. Finally a new charter was granted, in time to enfranchise them for the election of 1810.

Matters then returned to normal in Maldon for the remaining 22 years before the Reform Act. Strutt's son, Joseph Holden Strutt, retained much of the influence that his father had wielded, being generally considered to be able to nominate one of the two MPs or to choose to sit himself; as he exercised all government patronage in Maldon, he was well-placed to secure the other seat as well. But when the voters proved uncooperative, they could easily enough be overruled: at the 1826 election, the Corporation secured the result it wanted by admitting another thousand new freemen in time for them to vote: 3,113 freemen voted, of whom only 251 were Maldon residents.

After the Reform Act
In the initial drafts of the Reform Bill, Maldon was to lose one of its two seats. It was eventually spared this fate, but its population of 3,831 in 1831 left it very close to the borderline. The eventual Reform Act extended the borough by adding the neighbouring parish of Heybridge, increasing the population to 4,895; but with only 716 qualified voters under the new franchise its electorate was less than a quarter of what it had previously been. The constituency was a highly marginal one, victory rarely being secured by more than a handful of votes. In 1852, only 40 votes separated first place from fourth, and the second Tory's majority over his Whig opponent was only 6; after the losing candidates petitioned, alleging corruption, the election was declared void and Maldon's right to representation was suspended while a Royal Commission investigated. However, no major scandal was uncovered and (unlike some other boroughs similarly investigated at the same period) its right to vote was reinstated and a writ for a new by-election which took place in 1854 was issued.

Maldon county constituency (1885–1983)
The Second Reform Act, implemented in 1868, took seats from most of the smallest boroughs, and Maldon's representation was halved; but it was still too small, and at the election of 1885 the borough was abolished altogether. The county division into which the town was placed, however, was named after the town. (Officially, until 1918, it was the Eastern (or Maldon) Division of Essex; after that, simply the Maldon division.) As well as Maldon itself this contained the towns of Braintree, Halstead and Witham. Once again this constituency was a marginal one — almost the only rural county seat in the South East at this period not to be safely Conservative. The strength of the Liberal vote seems to have been based partly on the strength of Nonconformism in the Halstead area, but also on trade unionism among the agricultural labourers (which elsewhere in Essex was offset by a strongly Tory maritime vote which Maldon lacked).

After 1918, boundary changes added Burnham on Crouch and the surrounding district, but the constituency was still a rural one, with 35% of the occupied male population employed in the agricultural sector at the time of the 1921 census. The Labour Party rather than the Liberals were now the Conservatives' main opponents. When the Liberal Party split in 1922, Maldon's Liberals split as well, and the constituency was the first where the Lloyd George Liberals set up a constituency association, though this was apparently without the sanction of the national party headquarters and the association is not recorded as having organised any activities. In 1923 no Liberal candidate stood at all, and Labour captured the seat for the first time. The Conservatives retook the seat in 1924, holding it until the 1940s, but it was won by Tom Driberg in a wartime by-election; yet his hold on the seat was rarely secure and he eventually moved to sit for a safer seat. Thereafter Maldon remained Conservative until its abolition, though at first by the narrowest of margins.

The Maldon constituency was abolished in the boundary changes which came into effect at the 1983 election, being divided between the new Colchester South and Maldon and Rochford constituencies.

Members of Parliament

MPs 1332–1640

MPs 1640–1868

MPs 1868–1983

MPs since 2010
The re-formed Maldon seat was fought for the first time at the 2010 general election.

Elections

Elections in the 2010s

Elections in the 1970s

Elections in the 1960s

Elections in the 1950s

Elections in the 1940s 
Driberg was elected in 1942 as an Independent Labour candidate, but took the Labour Party whip in January 1945, and stood in the 1945 election as a Labour Party candidate.

Elections in the 1930s

Elections in the 1920s

Elections in the 1910s

Election results 1832–1918

Elections in the 1830s

Elections in the 1840s

Elections in the 1850s

 
 

The 1852 election was declared void on petition due to bribery and treating, and the writ was suspended in March 1853. A by-election was held in August 1854 to fill the vacancy.

Elections in the 1860s

 

Seat reduced to one member

Elections in the 1870s

Sandford's resignation caused a by-election.

Elections in the 1880s

Elections in the 1890s

Elections in the 1900s

Elections in the 1910s

General Election 1914–15:

Another General Election was required to take place before the end of 1915. The political parties had been making preparations for an election to take place and by July 1914, the following candidates had been selected; 
Unionist: James Fortescue Flannery
Liberal: E. Tweedy Smith

Pre-1832 election results

Elections in the 1830s

See also 
 1942 Maldon by-election
 List of parliamentary constituencies in Essex

Notes

References

Sources

 Robert Beatson, A Chronological Register of Both Houses of Parliament (London: Longman, Hurst, Res & Orme, 1807) 
 D. Brunton & D. H. Pennington, Members of the Long Parliament (London: George Allen & Unwin, 1954)
 John Cannon, Parliamentary Reform 1640-1832 (Cambridge: Cambridge University Press, 1972)
 Cobbett's Parliamentary history of England, from the Norman Conquest in 1066 to the year 1803 (London: Thomas Hansard, 1808) 
 The Constitutional Year Book for 1913 (London: National Union of Conservative and Unionist Associations, 1913)
 F. W. S. Craig, British Parliamentary Election Results 1832-1885 (2nd edition, Aldershot: Parliamentary Research Services, 1989)
 
 Michael Kinnear, The British Voter (London: BH Batsford, Ltd, 1968)
 J. Holladay Philbin, Parliamentary Representation 1832 - England and Wales (New Haven: Yale University Press, 1965)
 Edward Porritt and Annie G Porritt, The Unreformed House of Commons (Cambridge University Press, 1903)
 T. H. B. Oldfield, The Representative History of Great Britain and Ireland (London: Baldwin, Cradock & Joy, 1816)
 Henry Pelling, Social Geography of British Elections 1885-1910 (London: Macmillan, 1967)
 Robert Waller, The Almanac of British Politics (1st edition, London: Croom Helm, 1983)
 Frederic A. Youngs jr, Guide to the Local Administrative Units of England, Vol I (London: Royal Historical Society, 1979)

Parliamentary constituencies in Essex
Constituencies of the Parliament of the United Kingdom disestablished in 1983
Constituencies of the Parliament of the United Kingdom established in 1332
Constituencies of the Parliament of the United Kingdom established in 2010
Politics of Maldon District
Members of Parliament for Maldon